A shrew mole  or shrew-mole is a mole that resembles a shrew. Species with this name include:
 Five species in the subfamily Uropsilinae, or "shrew-like moles", native to China:
Equivalent teeth shrew mole (Uropsilus aequodonenia)
Anderson's shrew mole (Uropsilus andersoni)
Gracile shrew mole (Uropsilus gracilis)
Inquisitive shrew mole (Uropsilus investigator)
Chinese shrew mole (Uropsilus soricipes)
 Two species in the tribe Urotrichini, or himizu, native to Japan:
 Japanese shrew mole (Urotrichus talpoides)
 True's shrew mole (Dymecodon pilirostris)
 One species in the tribe Neurotrichini, native to Pacific North America:
 American shrew mole (Neurotrichus gibbsii)